Playback was an album recorded by The Appletree Theatre in 1967.

The project was set up by brothers Terry and John Boylan.  It was written, directed and performed by the Boylan brothers, supported by leading jazz session musicians including Larry Coryell and Eric Gale.

Playback was essentially a loosely woven concept album, divided into three acts, an overture, and an epilogue, with full-length pop songs such as "Hightower Square" and "I Wonder If Louise Is Home" linked by vocal narratives and snatches of music, including elements of jazz, acid rock, and classical music, sometimes given distorted sonic treatment.  It was released on the Verve Forecast label in the US and UK in 1968, with a different cover to the UK re-release from 1972 on the MGM Records label.  John Lennon, in a 1968 interview with Penny Nichols in London, called Playback one of his favourite new albums, and Philip Proctor acknowledged its influence on his own group, The Firesign Theatre. Time magazine stated that "this cycle of rock songs is an explosion of surprises, blending fey whimsy with just plain loony-bin clowning."

In the wake of the album's commercial failure Terry went solo, releasing three albums as a singer/songwriter, while John reappeared as a member of the short-lived Hamilton Streetcar before turning his attention to production with the Eagles, Linda Ronstadt, and others.  Three of the songs on the album - "I Wonder If Louise Is Home", "Don't Blame It on Your Wife", and "Barefoot Boy" - were released before by Ricky Nelson on his 1967 album Another Side of Rick, in which both the Boylan brothers were involved.

Playback was reissued on CD in 2007, with the different cover of the UK re-release from 1972.

Track listing
The Altogether Overture
...In the Beginning...
Hightower Square (3.16)
Act I
Lullaby (0.25)
Saturday Morning (1.53)
Nevertheless It Was Italy (2.15)
Act II
I Wonder If Louise Is Home (2.10)
Chez Louise (1.02)
"E" Train (1:00)
Meanwhile (0.15)
Brother Speed 	(3.15)
You're the Biggest Thing in My Life (3.35)
Act III
Don't Blame It on Your Wife (2.50)
The Sorry State of Staying Awake (3.54)
Epilogue
Barefoot Boy (2.43)
Lotus Flower  (2.16)
What a Way to Go (2.50)

All compositions by John and Terry Boylan

Musicians
John Boylan
Terry Boylan
Larry Coryell
Chuck Rainey
Herb Lovelle
Chuck Israels
Paul Griffin
Eric Gale
Buddy Saltzman
Michael Equine
Zal Yanovsky

References

1967 debut albums
Verve Forecast Records albums
The Appletree Theatre albums